Douglas Harold Palmer (born October 19, 1951) is a former politician who was the first African-American mayor of Trenton, New Jersey.

Biography 
Palmer was born in Trenton and attended Trenton public schools. He then graduated from the Bordentown Military Institute in Bordentown, New Jersey. He is a graduate of Virginia's private historically black college Hampton University, where he received a Bachelor of Science degree in Business Management in 1973. Doug is also a member of Groove Phi Groove Social Fellowship Incorporated. He took office as mayor of Trenton on July 1, 1990, having defeated former city council president and mayor Carmen Armenti.

Palmer helped to initiate the Trenton Office of Policy Studies, now the John S. Watson Institute for Public Policy, at Thomas Edison State University a unique think tank representing a partnership among the Mayor's Office, the University, and foundations to provide high quality focused research to the administration of a small city.

Palmer assembled a talented cabinet, including William Bill Watson as Chief of Staff, Alan Mallach as Director of Housing and Urban Development, and Elizabeth Johnson as Director of Recreation, Natural Resources, and Culture.

Palmer was a member of the Mayors Against Illegal Guns Coalition, a bipartisan group with a stated goal of "making the public safer by getting illegal guns off the streets." The Coalition is co-chaired by Boston Mayor Thomas Menino and New York City Mayor Michael Bloomberg.

Palmer announced at a press conference December 7, 2009, that he would not seek a sixth term as mayor of Trenton.

References

External links 
 www.groovephigroove.org
 Official page on Trenton city website
 CityMayors profile
 John S. Watson Institute for Public Policy
 

1951 births
Living people
Mayors of Trenton, New Jersey
African-American mayors in New Jersey
Hampton University alumni
Presidents of the United States Conference of Mayors
Bordentown Military Institute alumni
21st-century African-American people
20th-century African-American people